The Passage is a 1986 French supernatural thriller film starring Alain Delon.

The movie was a success with admissions of 1,998,983 in France.

Plot

Cast 
 Alain Delon as Jean Diaz
 Christine Boisson as Catherine Diaz
  Jean-Luc Moreau as Patrick
  Alain Musy as David Diaz
  Alberto Lomeo as Le chirurgien (“The surgeon”)
  Jean-Pierre Levasseur as L'anesthésiste (“The anesthetist”)
 Daniel Emilfork as La Mort (“Death”; uncredited)

References

External links

1986 films
1986 fantasy films
Films directed by René Manzor
French fantasy films
Films produced by Alain Delon
Films with screenplays by René Manzor
Films about animation
Films about personifications of death
1980s French films